Vincent E. Montgomery (May 6, 1890 – November 12, 1945) was an American football and basketball coach. He served as the head football coach at the University of South Dakota from 1927 to 1930. Montgomery was also the head basketball coach at South Dakota from 1923 to 1927. He had previously served as the football coach at Yankton College in Yankton, South Dakota. Montgomery died in 1945 in a plane crash while on leave from the military.

Head coaching record

Football

References

External links
 

1890 births
1945 deaths
Morningside Mustangs football players
South Dakota Coyotes athletic directors
South Dakota Coyotes football coaches
South Dakota Coyotes men's basketball coaches
Yankton Greyhounds football coaches
People from Buena Vista County, Iowa
Players of American football from Iowa
Accidental deaths in Arkansas
Basketball coaches from Iowa
Victims of aviation accidents or incidents in 1945
Victims of aviation accidents or incidents in the United States
American military personnel of World War II